Pictures from the Surface of the Earth is a photography book by German filmmaker and photographer Wim Wenders, first published in 2001. The book was the result of several travels that Wenders did around the world during 20 years, most when he was directing films and visiting different countries, including Germany, Cuba, the United States, Israel, Japan and Australia, which he documented in his photographic work. The book was made from the catalogue of an exhibition that first took place in 2001, and would be repeated in several different places the following years.

Description
The human presence is usually absent from this body of work, which explains the book's title. They usually depict desertic landscapes, city views, and architecture in the countries visited, and often serve as a background or as a complement for the films that Wenders was directing. Wenders also visited New York, shortly after the September 11 events, in November 2001, where he photographed Ground Zero, and the pictures taken also appear in the book.

References

2001 non-fiction books
German non-fiction books
Books by Wim Wenders
Landscape photography